Gøtu Ítróttarfelag, commonly known as just GÍ, was a football club based in Gøta, in the Faroe Islands.

History
It was founded in 1926. The club colours were yellow and blue. They played at the Serpugerdi Stadium and won 6 league titles. In January 2008 the club merged with Leirvík ÍF, forming the new club Víkingur.

Achievements
Faroe Islands Premier League Football: 6
 1983, 1986, 1993, 1994, 1995, 1996
Faroe Islands Cup: 6
 1983, 1985, 1996, 1997, 2000, 2005

UEFA club competition record

Matches

Historical list of managers

 Johan Nielsen (1992)
 Simun Peter Justinussen (1993–94)
 Johan Nielsen (1995)
 Páll Guðlaugsson (1996–97)
 Johan Nielsen (1998–02)
 Krzysztof Popczyński (2002–05)
 Petur Mohr (2 Oct 2005–07)

References

External links
Official website (Faroese)

Defunct football clubs in the Faroe Islands
Association football clubs established in 1926
Association football clubs disestablished in 2008
1926 establishments in the Faroe Islands
2008 disestablishments in the Faroe Islands